Meandrusa gyas, the brown gorgon, is a species of butterfly in the family Papilionidae. It is found from Sikkim to Assam and Upper Burma, as well as in Thailand.

Subspecies
Meandrusa gyas gyas
Meandrusa gyas sukkiti Nakano, 1995 (Thailand)

References

Papilionidae
Butterflies described in 1841